Belenois theuszi, the central caper white, is a butterfly in the family Pieridae. It is found in eastern Nigeria, Cameroon, Equatorial Guinea, Gabon, the Republic of the Congo, the Central African Republic, northern Angola, the Democratic Republic of the Congo and western Uganda. The habitat consists of primary, dense forest.

The larvae feed on Ritchiea species.

References

Seitz, A. Die Gross-Schmetterlinge der Erde 13: Die Afrikanischen Tagfalter. Plate XIII 14

Butterflies described in 1889
Pierini
Butterflies of Africa
Taxa named by Hermann Dewitz